(Hermann) Balduin Wolff (15 July 1819 – 21 November 1907) was a German painter of the Romantic period, and a chess player.

Born in Schmiedeberg im Riesengebirge (now Kowary), Silesia (then Prussia, now Poland), he graduated from a gymnasium of Hirschberg, and studied at Berlin University of the Arts (Universität der Künste Berlin) and Kunstakademie Düsseldorf (Staatliche Kunstakademie Düsseldorf).

He drew a game with Louis Paulsen in a blindfold simultaneous display at Düsseldorf in 1862.

References

1819 births
1907 deaths
19th-century German painters
German male painters
20th-century German painters
20th-century German male artists
German chess players
People from the Province of Silesia
Berlin University of the Arts alumni
Kunstakademie Düsseldorf alumni
19th-century chess players
19th-century German male artists